Jarawa people may refer to:
 Jarawa (Andaman Islands)
 Jarawa (Berber)